The 2011 Central American and Caribbean Championships in Athletics  were held in Mayagüez, Puerto Rico.  The event served as classifiers for the 2011 World Championships in Athletics and took place from July 15–17, 2011. It was the fourth time Puerto Rico hosted the event; the first time in Ponce in 1975, and later in San Juan in 1989 and 1997.

The Jamaican delegation topped the medals table with 26 medals (ten of them gold). Mexico was the next most successful nation with ten golds and a total haul of twenty medals, while Trinidad and Tobago took third with five golds and fifteen medals. Cuba, which had dominated the previous three editions, sent a small, weakened delegation and finished fifth  (although seven of its nine athletes won medals). The host nation, Puerto Rico, achieved a total of 14 medals, 3 of which were gold. This was a huge improvement for Puerto Rico since the last edition in 2009, winning 1 more gold medal and 8 more total medals than the previous championships.

Two Championship records were set at the competition: Bianca Stuart equalled the women's long jump best of 6.81 metres and Mexican Juan Romero improved the 10,000 metres record by 26 seconds. Further to this, twelve national records were bettered during the competition. Jamaica's Korene Hinds was the only athlete to medal twice in individual events, taking the steeplechase title and a silver medal in the women's 1500 metres.

Among the competition highlights were the men's 400 metres hurdles (featuring Leford Green, Félix Sánchez and Jehue Gordon) and a duel between Renny Quow and Ramon Miller in the 400 metres. Vonette Dixon won a quick women's 100 metres hurdles where Brigitte Merlano and Lina Flórez became the first Colombians under thirteen seconds for the event. Levern Spencer secured her fourth consecutive high jump title. Cuban throwers Guillermo Martínez and Roberto Janet were the only other athletes who defended their titles from the 2009 edition.

Organisation
The event had a budget of $650,000.00, the municipal government of Mayagüez has made a commitment to give $300,000.00 of these and the rest were from private sponsors. By April 28, 2011 twenty three participating countries had confirmed there attendance.

The final day of the event marked the first anniversary of the 2010 Central American and Caribbean Games and included artistic presentation in an activity in the plaza in front of the Central American Torch. The event was attended by Lamine Diack, the president of the International Association of Athletics Federations (IAAF).

Participation
There were 449 athletes from 35 countries (33 member federations of the Central American and Caribbean Athletic Confederation (CACAC) and 2 of the 4 observer nations – Curaçao and Martinique) competing in total. There were no athletes from Anguilla, French Guiana and Guadeloupe.

Athletes from Curaçao made their first appearance at the competition under their island's flag, following the dissolution of the Netherlands Antilles the previous year.

Medal summary

Men's events

Women's events

Medal table

Participating nations

 (6)
 (4)
 (29)
 (13)
 (1)
 (8)
 (7)
 (7)
 (32)
 (7)
 (8)
 (6)
 (5)
 (37)
 (10)
 (6)
 (3)
 (17)
 (8)
 (34)
 (4)
 (46)
 (2)
 (1)
 (4)
 (59)
 (8)
 (5)
 (9)
 (3)
 (2)
 (27)
 (1)
 (13)
 (17)

References

Results
CAC  Mayagüez  PUR  15 - 17 July/ 23rd Central American and Caribbean Championships. Tilastopaja. Retrieved on 2011-08-13.

External links
Official website
Official CACAC Website

Central American and Caribbean Championships in Athletics
Central American and Caribbean Championships
2011 Central American and Caribbean Championships in Athletics
2011 Central American and Caribbean Championships in Athletics
Central American and Caribbean Championships in Athletics
Athletic
Athletic